Amel Tuka (born 9 January 1991) is a Bosnian middle-distance runner who competes in the 800 metres. His achievements include a silver medal at the 2019 World Championships as well as a bronze medal at the 2015 World Championships. Tuka holds national records in the 400 m and 800 m disciplines. His personal best is 1:42.51 in the 800 metres.
 
On 17 July 2015, with a time of 1:42.51, Tuka positioned himself as the world leader in the men's 800 metres for the year 2015. He subsequently earned his country's first medal in a major athletics championship with his third-place finish in the men's 800 metres at the 2015 World Championships in Athletics. He earned his second medal at the World Championships in 2019, finishing second in the men's 800 metres.

Athletics career
Tuka was recruited by Atletski klub Zenica to train full-time in track and field after winning a low-profile 400m race in Zenica. He soon became one of the most competitive middle-distance runner in the country, having competed and won medals in numerous regional and continental (European) championships.

In June 2013, Tuka won the 800 metres race at the 2013 European Team Championships Third League, running a time of 1:51.11. Less than a month later, Tuka earned third place at the 2013 European Athletics U23 Championships in the 800 metres, running a national record time of 1:46.29. After the championships, Tuka moved from his native Bosnia to Verona, Italy to train with coach Gianni Ghidini.

At the 2014 European Athletics Championships, Tuka placed sixth in the men's 800 metres final, breaking his record by running a new personal best of 1:46.12.

On 1 July 2015, Tuka won the men's 800 metres at the 20th Annual International Meeting in Velenje, Slovenia and qualified for the 2016 Summer Olympics by running 1:44.19. On 11 July 2015, he ran even faster, winning the men's 800m in Madrid with a time of 1:43.84. Just six days later at the high-profile Herculis meet in Monaco, Tuka made another major improvement with a win of 1:42.51, making him the eleventh fastest 800 metres runner of all time and the fastest one in the world at the time. In the process, he earned a head-to-head victory over Olympic silver medalist Nigel Amos and defending World Champion Mohammed Aman.

2015 World Championships
At the 2015 World Championships in Athletics, Tuka's finishing speed against conventional 800-meter runners caused world record holder David Rudisha to try a rarely used strategy of slowing the pace until the final 200 metres of the race.  Tuka was perfectly positioned for his normal finish but Rudisha's exceptionally fast finish and strategic positioning by his Kenyan teammate Ferguson Rotich took Tuka out of his game.  Tuka finished in bronze medal position, earning Bosnia its first medal in a major athletics championship.

2016 Summer Olympics
Tuka competed at the 2016 Summer Olympics, where he finished 12th overall in the 800-meter race By reaching the semi-finals in Rio, Tuka became the first runner from Bosnia and Herzegovina to advance from the Heats stage at the Olympics. Amel Tuka was also the Bosnian flag bearer for his country at the opening ceremony of the games.

2019 World Championships
At the 2019 World Athletics Championships, Tuka earned his second medal at a World Athletics Championships, finishing in silver medal position with a season best time of 1:43.47 behind Donavan Brazier.

2020 Summer Olympics
Tuka competed at the 2020 Summer Olympics and became the first athlete from Bosnia and Herzegovina to advance to a track and field final at the Olympics, where he placed 6th in the 800-meter final.

Running style

 
In the 800 metres, Tuka has developed a reputation for being a kicker because of his apparent speed at the end of the race, when in reality he runs even splits. Most of that speed is relative to the exhaustion as his opponents slow. Tuka takes the beginning of the race out slowly, re-gaining contact with the rest of the field near the last 200 metres and ends with a strong finishing kick.

Amel Tuka has said when he was younger he idolized the running style of track athlete Jeremy Wariner, who influenced him to run the 400 m (instead of the more popular 100 m), before subsequently switching to the 800 m.

Competition record

Note: This table only includes major athletics championships and does not include Diamond League or World Athletics Continental Tour/IAAF World Challenge meets.
1 Did not start in the semi-finals

References

External links
 

Living people
1991 births
People from Kakanj
Bosniaks of Bosnia and Herzegovina
Bosnia and Herzegovina male middle-distance runners
World Athletics Championships athletes for Bosnia and Herzegovina
World Athletics Championships medalists
Athletes (track and field) at the 2015 European Games
European Games competitors for Bosnia and Herzegovina
Athletes (track and field) at the 2016 Summer Olympics
Olympic athletes of Bosnia and Herzegovina
Athletes (track and field) at the 2020 Summer Olympics